Henryk Kempny (24 January 1934 – 29 May 2016) was a Polish footballer. He played in 16 matches for the Poland national football team from 1955 to 1958.

References

1934 births
2016 deaths
Polish footballers
Poland international footballers
Association footballers not categorized by position